Fredriksskans is a multi-purpose stadium in Kalmar, Sweden. It served as the home ground for Kalmar FF until it was replaced by Guldfågeln Arena in 2011. It is used for football matches and atlethics. The stadium holds 9,000 people and was built in 1919.

References

Football venues in Sweden
Multi-purpose stadiums in Sweden
Buildings and structures in Kalmar County
Sport in Kalmar